Amparo High School (AHS) is a public secondary school located in Caloocan, Philippines. The school operates under the Division of City Schools, Caloocan, DepEd NCR.

Amparo was established in 1979. An annex was constructed in 2005.

References

External links
 Official website

High schools in Metro Manila
Educational institutions established in 1979
1979 establishments in the Philippines
Schools in Caloocan